The Birthday Eve is the first studio album by Japanese heavy metal band Loudness.  It was released in 1981 only in Japan. The 24bit digitally remastered Japanese limited edition CD includes two additional tracks not on the original release, coming from the first single of the band. The success of the album was measured by Loudness' sold out debut concert at Asakusa International Theater, in front of an audience of 2.700.

Track listing 
All music by Akira Takasaki, all lyrics by Minoru Niihara
Side one
 "Loudness" - 5:10
 "Sexy Woman" - 5:40
 "Open Your Eyes" - 4:32
 "Street Woman" - 5:17

Side two
"To Be Demon" - 6:07
 "I'm on Fire" - 3:41
 "High Try" - 5:07
 "Rock Shock (More and More)" - 4:56

2005 Japanese CD edition bonus tracks
"Burning Love" - 3:57
 "Bad News" - 4:27

Personnel 
Loudness
Minoru Niihara - vocals
Akira Takasaki - guitars
Masayoshi Yamashita - bass 
Munetaka Higuchi - drums

Production
Daiko Nagato - producer
Seigen Ono - engineer, mixing
Kenichi Kishi, Masao Nakajima - label executives
Keisuke Tsukimitsu - art direction

References 

1981 debut albums
Loudness (band) albums
Nippon Columbia albums
Japanese-language albums
Albums produced by Daiko Nagato